Football league competition in Malaysia began in 1982 with each state represented by their respective teams compete in Liga Malaysia. However, it purpose was just to be a qualifying round for the knock-out stage for Malaysia Cup. During that time, all states participating in this league alongside the police and army as well as the two countries, namely Singapore and Brunei which all send an amateur team for the competition.

From the season of 1989 until 1993, the Malaysian football league entered the semi-pro era with the creation of Liga Semi-Pro (MSPFL) which still be a two divisions league.

From 1994 to 1997 Malaysian football witnessed the creation of the country's first professional football league, the Liga Perdana, in which all teams was put into a single-tier league.

In 1998, the league was divided again with the creation of two-division league, Liga Perdana 1 and Liga Perdana 2 where it continued to operate until 2003.

Malaysia Super League was introduced in 2004 to replace the previous top-tier division as Malaysian football entered the privatisation era of football league.

Malaysian League (1982–1988)

Below are the list of the top division amateur league champions from the introduction of league trophy in 1982 to 1988.

Liga Semi-Pro Divisyen 1 (1989–1993)

Below are the list of the top division semi-pro league champions from 1989 to 1993.

Liga Perdana (1994–1997)

Below are the list of the top division professional league champions from 1994 to 1997.

Liga Perdana 1 (1998–2003)

Below are the list of the top division league champions from 1998 to 2003.

Malaysia Super League (2004–present)

Below are the list of the top division league champions from 2004 to present.

Italic indicates Double winners – i.e. top division league and Malaysia FA Cup / Malaysia Cup winners

Bold indicates Treble winners – i.e. top division league, Malaysia FA Cup and Malaysia Cup winners

Total titles won

The table below list the top division winners since league trophy was introduced for the winners of Liga Malaysia in 1982.

Total titles won by region

Below are the list of the total top division titles won by region.

See also
 Malaysia Super League
 Malaysia Premier League
 Malaysia FA Cup
 Malaysia Cup

References

Football competitions in Malaysia